Stepan Viktorovych Chubenko (Ukrainian: Степан Вікторович Чубенко; 11 November 1997 – 27 July 2014) was a Ukrainian football player who played as a goalkeeper of Avanhard Kramartorsk. He was tortured and shot by militants of the pro-Russian militia organization of the Donetsk People's Republic for his pro-Ukrainian position.

Biography

Chubenko studied at the Kramatorskoy Secondary School Number 12, and was fond of sports. At first he was engaged in the Greco-Roman wrestling, then he was fond of football, and defended the gates of the youth team "Avangard" from Kramatorsk, and Donetsk, visited his matches in Donetsk, and traveled with the team to other cities of Ukraine. With friends, he organized a team of KVN, which traveled to perform in different cities of Ukraine. Also, with friends, Stepan took care of a children's home in Kramatorsk. They often visited children, brought them toys, clothes, books, and delicacies. Stepan said to his girlfriend that when they marry, they will have one child and adopt two more.

With the onset of pro-Russian forces in Ukraine in 2014, Stepan and his friends took part in rallies in support of the integrity of Ukraine, held in Kramatorsk. The boys brought water, products, and hygiene products for the Ukrainian soldiers who arrived in the city. During the bombing, he helped go downstairs to the elderly, carrying water to them when the city's water supply was cut off. Risking his life, Stepan took out the flag of the DPR from the city square.

In April 2014, when Russian backed Donetsk People Republic militants seized the city, their mother drove Stepan to her parents in Russia, but a month later he returned, declaring that he did not want to hide "like a rat" in times difficult for the country.

In June 2014, Stepan went to a friend in Kyiv. On June 23, he took a train in the capital to return home. He traveled through Donetsk where he was detained by militants from the Kerch battalion, according to reports, for a yellow-blue ribbon on a backpack, and according to Igor Stokoz, a representative of the Donetsk regional military-civilian administration, because he had entered into a dispute with defending the position of a single indivisible country. The bandits began to beat the juvenile boy in Donetsk. Then he was taken to Horbachevo-Mykhailivka, where after terrible torture, he was shot.

Immediately after the disappearance of his son, his mother traveled to Donetsk on his wanted list. She was able to find out that the boy was shot and talked with Donetsk People Republic leader Alexander Zakharchenko, who said he'd find the body of her son and his killers. At the end of September 2014, the mother came to the news that the body was found. Exhumation happened on October 3, during which, the mother recognized her son. She succeeded in getting him sent to Kramatorsk. On November 8, 2014, Stepan Chubenko was buried in his home town.

Investigation to Chubenko's murder

Chubenko's killers were three militants from the Kerch battalion, containing Yury Moskalyov (born in 1969), Vadim Pogodin (born in 1971), and Maksim Sukhomlynov (born in 1984). Moksalyov and Pagodin are residents born in Donetsk, while Sukhomlynov is from Makiivka. Stepan's mother, Stalina Vyacheslavivna, was told by the DPR authorities that her son's killers had been caught, but two of them managed to escape to the occupied Crimea.

In July 2017, the Prosecutor General's Office of Ukraine asked Russia to extradite the DPR militant, Pogodin, who was one of the militants that killed Chubenko.

On 10 November 2017, the Toretsk City Court handed down a sentence in absentia to the suspects in Chubenko's murder. Pogodin, a former commander of the Kerch Battalion, and his militants Moskalyov, and Sukhomlinov were sentenced to life in prison in absentia. The court also upheld a civil lawsuit filed by Stalina Chubenko, according to which each of the convicts must pay ₴1 million in compensation.

In November 2017, Pogodin, Moskalyov and Sukhomlinov were sentenced to life imprisonment in absentia by the  court. «As part of investigation of criminal proceedings according to item 3, 12 h. 2 Art. 115 (premeditated murder of a kidnapped person, committed by a group of persons with prior conspiracy) of the Criminal Code of Ukraine, a number of forensic examinations were conducted and comprehensive evidence of militants' guilt in the audacious and brutal murder of a young man was collected,” said Donetsk Region Prosecutor Yevhen Bondarenko. The two killers are hiding in Russia, with Pogodin in occupied Crimea.

Honoring Memorial

In honor of Stepan Chubenko, an annual football tournament is held in Kramatorsk. 

On 8 May 2016 the title Hero of Ukraine were posthumously given to his parents, Stalina and Viktor, his father.

On 21 November 2016, a memorial plaque was unveiled at the school where Chubenko studied.

On 23 September 2017, a memorial plaque to Chubenko was unveiled at the entrance to the Avangard Stadium in Kramatorsk.

Since 2019  holds a yearly children literary competition named after Stepan Chubenko.

On 24 July 2021 the 21st Territorial Defence Battalion "Sarmat" named one of its combat vehicles after Chubenko.

A monument to Stepan Chubenko was unveiled in Kramatorsk in early December 2021. Kramatorsk sculptor, Ihor Nesterenko worked on the project of the monument. Chubenko was depicted in full length with a ball in his hands, in the form of a team with the emblem of the Kramatorsk football club "Avangard" and with the first number.

See also 
 Volodymyr Rybak (murder victim)
 Volnovakha bus attack
 January 2015 Mariupol rocket attack

References

1997 births
2014 deaths
Recipients of the Order For Courage, 3rd class
FC Kramatorsk players
Association football goalkeepers
Ukrainian footballers
Russian war crimes in Ukraine